Itesiwaju is a Local Government Area in Oyo State, Nigeria. Its headquarters are in the town of Otu.

It has an area of 1,514 km and a population of 128,652 at the 2006 census.

The postal code of the area is 202.

References

Local Government Areas in Oyo State